Southbridge is a city in Worcester County, Massachusetts, United States. The population was 17,740 at the 2020 census. Although Southbridge has a city form of government, it is legally known as the Town of Southbridge.

History

The area was initially inhabited by the Nipmuck and Mohegan tribes, with the Quinebaug River dividing their territories. As early as 1638, John Winthrop, Jr. purchased Tantiusques, a tract for mining lead centered at what is now Leadmine Road in Sturbridge (it was thought at the time that where there was lead, there should be silver nearby). In fact the mineral deposit was graphite which the Winthrops commercialized employing Nipmuck miners.

Southbridge was first settled by Europeans in 1730. In 1801 a poll parish, named the Second Religious Society of Charlton, and popularly called Honest Town, was formed from the west part of Dudley, the southwest part of Charlton and the southeast part of Sturbridge. In 1816 this parish was incorporated to become the township of Southbridge. Among the first settlers was Moses Marcy, who owned a home on the site of what is now Notre Dame church and was elected to Congress, and the Dennison family. Water power from the Quinebaug River made Southbridge a good location for sawmills and gristmills in the 18th century, and textile mills in the 19th century. After the Civil War, many immigrants of Irish and French Canadian descent came to work and live there; by the 1930s they had been joined by Poles, Greeks, Italians and others.

Southbridge has a long history of manufacturing optical products, earning it the unofficial title "Eye of the Commonwealth", in reference to the Commonwealth of Massachusetts. Under the Wells family, the American Optical Company ("AO") became the world's largest manufacturer of ophthalmic products, and at its height employed more than 6,000 people around the world. Many of its workers were exempted from the draft during World War II since they were doing vital defense work, including making Norden bombsights and even some work on the atomic bomb.

By the early 1960s, the mill town had a movie theatre, an AM radio station (WESO), and an airport. New immigrants from Puerto Rico, Laos, and Vietnam began arriving in the 1970s and 1980s, and the town now has a significant Hispanic and Puerto Rican population. The American Optical Company shut down in 1984, and Southbridge is still struggling from the loss of these and other manufacturing jobs.

Geography
Southbridge is drained by the Quinebaug River.

The principal road in Southbridge is Route 131, known as Main Street through downtown and East Main Street past the "AO Rotary" and through Sandersdale, a village on the town's east side. North-south roads include Eastford Road and Elm Street (Route 198), and Worcester Street-Mechanic Street-North Woodstock Road (Route 169).Also Gulpwood road leads up to Charlton and Dudley

Southbridge was formed out of portions of three of its neighboring towns: Sturbridge to the west, Charlton to the north, and Dudley to the east. The other neighboring town is Woodstock, Connecticut to the south.

Demographics

As of the census of 2010, there were 16,719 people, 7,077 households, and 4,522 families residing in the city. The racial makeup of the city was 81.2% White, 2.6% Black or African American, 0.5% Native American, 1.9% Asian, 0.0% Pacific Islander, and 2.9% from two or more races. Hispanic or Latino of any race were 26.6% of the population.

There were 7,077 households, out of which 31.1% had children under the age of 18 living with them, 43.6% were married couples living together, 15.5% had a female householder with no husband present, and 36.1% were non-families. 29.7% of all households were made up of individuals, and 12.1% had someone living alone who was 65 years of age or older.  The average household size was 2.41 and the average family size was 2.98.

In the city, the population was spread out, with 25.4% under the age of 18, 8.6% from 18 to 24, 30.3% from 25 to 44, 20.7% from 45 to 64, and 15.1% who were 65 years of age or older.  The median age was 36 years. For every 100 females, there were 92.8 males.  For every 100 females age 18 and over, there were 87.2 males.

The median income for a household in the city was $33,913, and the median income for a family was $41,863. Males had a median income of $36,008 versus $25,685 for females. The per capita income for the city was $18,514.  About 13.0% of families and 15.4% of the population were below the poverty line, including 25.8% of those under age 18 and 10.2% of those age 65 or over.

Government

Southbridge is one of fourteen Massachusetts municipalities that have applied for, and been granted, city forms of government but wish to retain "The town of" in their official names

Library

The Southbridge Public Library was founded in 1870. In fiscal year 2008, the town of Southbridge spent 1.03% ($426,025) of its budget on its public library—approximately $25 per person, per year ($32.94 adjusted for inflation to 2022).

The Jacob Edwards Library is the public library for the town of Southbridge. It is a member of Central Massachusetts Regional Library System (CMRLS) and C/W MARS.

Education

Southbridge has two public elementary schools, formerly "neighborhood schools" serving grades K–5. Since the 1988–1989 school year, however, all kindergarten and 1st grade classes have been at Eastford Road School; all of grades 2–3 at Charlton Street School; and all of grades 4–5 at West Street School. In the mid 2010s Schools were shifted so that Eastford Road School housed Pre-K–1, and the Charlton Street School housed grades 2–5 in traditional neighborhood style, while the West Street School has been turned into a Dual Language School.  Grades 6–12 are at Southbridge Middle School and Southbridge High School. Southbridge residents can also attend Bay Path Regional Vocational Technical High School in Charlton.

In addition to the public schools, a parochial private school, Trinity Catholic Academy, serves Pre-K through eighth grade.

On January 26, 2016, the Massachusetts Board of Elementary and Secondary Education placed Southbridge School District in state receivership.

Transportation
Southbridge is served by Southbridge Municipal Airport(3B0), a public owned airport managed through a contract with Jim's Flying Service. Runway 02/20 has a 3501 x 75 feet asphalt surface.

Sites of interest
 The Quinebaug Valley Council for the Arts and Humanities – Arts Center
 Gateway Players Theatre
 New York, New Haven & Hartford Passenger Depot
 Southbridge Hotel and Conference Center
 Westville Lake and Recreation Area, outdoor recreation area along the Quinebaug River
 The Vienna Restaurant and Historic Inn
 The Optical Heritage Museum

Notable people
 Geraldo Alicea, politician
 George Thorndike Angell, lawyer
 Jeff Belanger, author
 Don Berry, statistician
 Franklin E. Brooks, politician
 Mark Carron, politician
 Sidney Clarke, politician
 George Constantine, racing driver
 Jane Cunningham Croly, author
 Joel DiGregorio, keyboardist for the Charlie Daniels Band
 Kenny Dykstra, wrestler
 Michael Earls, Jesuit priest
 John Fitzgerald, football player
 Félix Gatineau, historian and politician
 Francis Harper, biologist
 William L. Marcy, politician and Governor of New York
 Leo Martello, priest
 Ann McNamee, musician
 Tim Moriarty, journalist
 Calvin Paige, businessman and politician
 Winthrop D. Putnam, soldier
 Barbara Stevens, college basketball coach
 Charles Burt Sumner, minister
 Bill Swiacki, football player
 Marilyn Travinski, politician
 Mfoniso Udofia, writer
 Cady Wells, painter
 David Wu, actor

See also
 Center of Hope Foundation
 Dexter-Russell, cutlery manufacturing company in Southbridge
 National Register of Historic Places listings in Southbridge, Massachusetts
 Hamilton Woolen Company Historic District
 Stonebridge Press, newspaper company based in Southbridge
 Westville Dam
 List of mill towns in Massachusetts

References

External links

 Town of Southbridge official website
 Jacob Edwards Library
  History and info of Southbridge, MA
 History of Southbridge, MA (PDF)
 The Southbridge Evening News
 The Future of Southbridge
 Southbridge History, Old Newspaper Articles, Genealogy

 
Cities in Massachusetts
Cities in Worcester County, Massachusetts
Populated places established in 1730
1730 establishments in Massachusetts